This is a list of governors of the Venezuelan state of Monagas.

Until 1989 they were appointed by the president of Venezuela. Starting from that year they are elected in universal, direct and secret elections. In some years the head of Monagas state was known as president or civil and military chief, in others governor. Monagas was created in its present form in 1909. It existed previously as the Province of Maturín (Maturín being its capital) from 1856, becoming the State of Maturín in 1864, before being merged with another state in 1879.

Monagas State precursors
Governors of the Province of Maturín/State of Maturín
(1856–64)
  Valentín Machado
  Pedro Sifontes
  Jesús María Vallenilla
  José Antonio López P.
  Zabulón Valverde
  Joaquín Núñez
  Francisco J. Gordon
  José R. Rodríguez Guerra
  Luis Mijares Zerpa
  Manuel B. Fonseca (1863, Provisional President)(1863–64)
  José Manuel García
  José Félix Lares
  Félix Salazar

Governors of Nueva Andalucía State, which Maturín belonged to (1865–68)
  José E, Acosta. (1865, Constitutional President)
  Antonio Russián. (1866–68, First Appointed)
  José S. González. (September 1868, Constitutional President)
  Manuel López Alcalá. (1868)

Governors of Maturín
  José Ramón Ramírez. (1865–68)

Provisional Government: (1868)
  José A. López
  José María Núñez
  Mateo Sosa

Civil and Military Chiefs
  Ángel Romero. (1869)
  Manuel Guzmán Álvarez. (1870)
  Rómulo Camino. (1872, Provisional President)
  Manuel Guzmán Álvarez. (1873, Constitucional President)
  Rómulo Camino. (1874, First Appointed)
  Diego B. Ferrer. (1875, First Appointed)
  Antonio Valverde. (1876, Second Appointed)
  Manuel Guzmán Álvarez. (1877, Constitucional President)
  Emilio Himiob. (1877, First Appointed)
  José Antonio Vázquez. (1878, Second Appointed)
  Jesús M. Vallenilla. (1878, President)
  Santos Carrera. (1879, Vicepresident)
  Venancio Simosa. (1880, Provisional President)
  Santos Carrera. (January to May 1881, Constitutional President)
  Fermín Carrera. (1881, Governor)
  Joaquín Díaz. (1881, Governor)
  Carrera. (1882, Governor)

Monagas State
Presidents of Monagas State (20th century)
  J. V. Guevara. (1901)
  Pablo Giuseppi Monagas. (1910, Provisional President)
  Emilio Fernández (1911–13)
  José J. Aróstegui. (1914, Counsellor in charge of the Presidency)
  Manuel Ángeles. (1916)
  Emilio Pérez Hernández. (1918)
  Pedro Ducharme. (1922–24)
  Manuel Ledesma. (1925–28)
  Juan Pablo López Centeno. (1936–37)
  Andrés Rolando M. (1937)
  Alejandro Rascaniere. (1938–39)
  José María Isava Núñez. (1939–42)
  Francisco Conde García. (1942–45)
  Pablo II. Higuera. (1945)
  Rafael Rodríguez Méndez. (1946–48)
  Pablo Higuera. (1948)
  Ramón Rojas Guardia. (1949)
  Alirio Ugarte Pelayo. (1949–51)
  Horacio Guerrero Gori. (1952)
  Giliberti Gómez. (1953)
  Federico Scholoeter. (1953)
  Domingo Colmenares Vivas. (1954–57)

Governors of Monagas State since 1958
  Temístocles Núñez R. (1958–59)
  Jorge Yibirín Marún (1959–60)
  Luis Piñerúa Ordaz. (1960–61)
  Armando Sánchez Bueno. (1961–62)
  Darío Rodríguez Méndez. (1963–64)
  Noel Grisanti Luciani. (1964–65)
  Luis Alfaro Ucero. (1966–68)
  José Tomás Milano Parma. (1968–69)
  Humberto Anderson. (1969)
  Rafael Solórzano Bruce. (1969–73)
  Pedro Cardier Gago. (1973–74)
  Martín Márquez Añez. (1974–78)
  Manuel García B. (1978–79)
  Pablo Morillo Robles. (1979–83)
  Luis Guevara Manosalva. (1983–84)
  Pedro Cabello Poleo. (1984–86)
  Guillermo Call. (1986–87)
  Pedro Augusto Beauperthuy. (1987–89)

 Governors chosen by direct election

References 

 Cuadro Comparativo Gobernadores Electos por Entidad Elecciones 1989-1992-1995-1998-2000.
 CNE: Elecciones Regionales del 2004.
 CNE: Elecciones Regionales del 2008
 CNE: Elecciones Regionales del 2012
 CNE: Elecciones Regionales del 2017
 Venezuela vote dispute escalates foreign sanctions threat (2017)

Monagas
Monagas